Preform may refer to:

 Preform, a  piece of glass used to draw an optical fiber
 Preform, a piece of polyethylene terephthalate test tube shaped form blown into a completed bottle
 Preform, an incomplete and unused basic form of a stone tool in lithic reduction
 Preform, a specially designed shape of solder
 Preform, a high quality, precision metal stamping used for a variety of brazing and joining applications
 PreForm, a a software package from 3D printing technology company Formlabs

See also 
 Perform
 Preformationism, a theory that organisms develop from miniature versions of themselves